Life in a Day is the debut album by Simple Minds, released in April 1979 by record label Zoom. It reached number 30 in the UK Albums Chart. The title track and "Chelsea Girl" were issued as singles.

Recording
The album was recorded between mid-December 1978 and early-February 1979 in the grounds of Farmyard Studios, Little Chalfont, Buckinghamshire, using the mobile unit The Mobile Studio, with further recording at Abbey Road Studios (including the recording of an orchestra for the track "Pleasantly Disturbed"), and mixed at Townhouse Studios, London. The original working title for the album "Children of the Game" (a reference to Jean Cocteau's novel of that name) had been dropped and changed to "Life in a Day" after the band had written the title track in January 1979. After the band's first choice of producer John Cale was vetoed by Arista Records, the album was produced and mixed by John Leckie. The album was completed in late February 1979. The recording sessions yielded the full album, the b-side "Special View" and two unfinished out-takes, "Rosemary's Baby" and "Children of the Game". The track-listing and mastering was finalised in March 1979.

Release and reception
Life in a Day was released by the independent label Zoom Records and licensed to Arista Records. The album's artwork was created by Carole Moss, a friend of John Leckie.  The album spent six weeks in the UK LP charts and reached number 30 on 12 May 1979. The title track was released on 30 March as Simple Minds' first single and reached No. 62 in the UK charts, spending two weeks there. "Chelsea Girl", considered the strongest track on the album, was held back as the second single by Arista Records, but it failed to chart at all. A tribute to Nico and the Andy Warhol film Chelsea Girls, it was a popular live song for the band.

Andy Kellman of AllMusic rated the album the lowest of Simple Minds' first five album releases, remarking on its derivativeness of Magazine and Roxy Music and ranking "Someone" as the best track. NME'''s Tony Stewart praised the lyrics and arrangements despite noting the overt influences of 1970s music, and rated "Murder Story" the standout track. Although noting the album as overproduced and undermining the band's sound, he rated the album favourably.

In a 2012 interview, the band's frontman Jim Kerr expressed regret that the album's production had resulted in the tracks lacking "a real spark" that was part of their live performances, and described his feelings about the album as "bittersweet". He recalled at the time, "as we were about to drive up to Scotland, someone gave me a cassette of Unknown Pleasures'' by Joy Division... and I thought, we've completely blown it."—ruing that their live material had sounded more like Velvet Underground and less like the Boomtown Rats.

Track listing

Personnel
Adapted from the album's liner notes.
Simple Minds
Jim Kerr – lead vocals, arrangements
Charles Burchill – guitar, violin, vocals, arrangements
Derek Forbes – bass, vocals, arrangements
Brian McGee – drums, percussion, vocals, arrangements
Michael MacNeil – keyboards, vocals, arrangements
Technical
John Leckie – producer, engineer, arrangements
George Chambers – tape operator
Carole Moss – cover photography, design

Charts

References

External links
 
 

Simple Minds albums
1979 debut albums
Albums produced by John Leckie